(born November 9, 1975), is a Japanese trombone performer.

Early life
Kanda began playing trombone at the age of 10 in Tokyo, Japan, and attended the Toho High School of Music, where she won first prize in a Japanese national competition.
After high school, she moved to the United States and earned a Bachelor of Music from the Cleveland Institute of Music where she studied with James DeSano, principal trombone of the Cleveland Orchestra.
She was first hired as a professional trombonist by the Albany Symphony Orchestra in 1997, and then worked for the Rochester Philharmonic.  From 2004 to 2008, she served on the board of directors for the International Trombone Association.

Current
Kanda is currently the principal trombonist with the Milwaukee Symphony Orchestra (MSO) in Milwaukee, Wisconsin, a position she won in 2002 (out of a field of 76 applicants for the position, only seven of whom were female).
Andreas Delfs was the Music Director of the MSO at the time.

Megumi Kanda is an Artist and Clinician with Greenhoe Trombones, a company founded by her (retired) colleague in the Milwaukee Symphony Orchestra, Gary Greenhoe. Kanda plays a Greenhoe GC4-1R Tenor Trombone.

Kanda is married to Dietrich Hemann, with whom she has three children.

Discography
Kanda is featured on the following albums (all tracks of each album, unless otherwise noted).

References

1975 births
Japanese women musicians
Japanese trombonists
Living people
Cleveland Institute of Music alumni
21st-century Japanese women musicians